Ginglymocladus is a genus of false soldier beetles in the family Omethidae. There are at least two described species in Ginglymocladus.

Species
These two species belong to the genus Ginglymocladus:
 Ginglymocladus discoidea Van Dyke, 1918
 Ginglymocladus luteicollis Van Dyke, 1918

References

Further reading

 

Elateroidea
Articles created by Qbugbot